The 1916 Michigan State Normal Normalites football team was an American football team that represented Michigan State Normal College (later renamed Eastern Michigan University) as an independent during the 1916 college football season.  In their second and final season under head coach Elmer Mitchell, the Normalites compiled a 1–2–1 record and were outscored by a total of 33 to 18. Alexander J. Longnecker was the team captain.

Mitchell was both football coach and athletic director at Michigan State Normal College. In March 1917, he was hired as the University of Michigan´s head basketball coach and assistant coach to the football and baseball teams.

Schedule

References

Michigan State Normal
Eastern Michigan Eagles football seasons
Michigan State Normal Normalites football